Waita is a settlement in Kenya's Eastern Province.

Waita is located in the region of. Kitui's capital, is approximately 66 km/ 41 mi away from Waita. The distance from Waita to Kenya's capital  Nairobi is approximately 153 km/ 95 mi.

References 

Populated places in Eastern Province (Kenya)